
Cyzicenus may refer to:

People
 Antiochus IX Cyzicenus, a king of the Seleucid Empire.
 Gelasius of Cyzicus (Gelasius Cyzicenus), an ecclesiastical writer in the 5th century

Other
 Cyzicene hall, an architectural term.